The Goharshad Mosque rebellion took place in August 1935, when a backlash against the westernizing and secularist policies of Reza Shah of the Pahlavi dynasty erupted in the Imam Reza Shrine in Mashhad, Iran.

The incident is described as a "bloody event".

Background
The Shah's violent Westernization campaign against Shiite society saw a spike in hostilities with the regime in the summer of 1935 when Reza Shah banned traditional Islamic clothing and ordered all men be forced to wear European-style bowler hats.

Event
The event occurred in response to the de-Islamization activities by Reza Shah in 1935. Responding to a cleric, who denounced the Shah's "heretical" innovations, westernizing, corruption, and heavy consumer taxes, many merchants and locals took refuge in the shrine, chanted slogans such as "The Shah is a new Yazid," likening him to the Umayyad caliph.

For four full days, local police and the army refused to violate the shrine. The standoff was ended when troops from Iranian Azerbaijan region arrived and broke into the shrine, killing dozens and injuring hundreds, and marking a final rupture between Shia clergy and the Shah.

Toll
According to a report of the Research Institute of Baqir al-'Ulum, which may have deliberately exaggerated the numbers, the number of killed by Reza Shah's forces was between 2000-5000. According to a British report, which may have deliberately underplayed the numbers, the outcome of the event resulted in 2 Army officers and 18 soldiers killed; 2 soldiers executed on the spot for disobedience; 1 soldier committed suicide; there were 800-1200 dead among the villagers, 100-500 wounded and 800 arrested.

See also
1979 Grand Mosque seizure
Kashf-e hijab
Abadan Crisis
White Revolution
Iranian Revolution
List of modern conflicts in the Middle East

References

Conflicts in 1935
1935 in Iran
Battles involving Iran
Massacres in religious buildings and structures
Massacres in Iran
Mass murder in 1935
1935 murders in Iran